SKY Airline Perú, also known as SꓘY or SKY Peru, is an airline based in Lima, Peru and is the second largest airline in the Peruvian market. It is a subsidiary of Sky Airline, which is based in Chile. It operates scheduled domestic and international services. Its main hub is Jorge Chávez International Airport.

History 
The airline was established in April 2019 as part of a planned expansion of SKY Airline in Latin America. SKY Peru operations were more successful than originally anticipated, which led to the addition of more aircraft than originally projected.

Destinations 
As of February 2022, the airline flies to 12 destinations in Peru, and has flights to 3 countries from its Lima hub. This year, the airline will increase and start new domestic destinations such as Cajamarca, Chiclayo, Tacna and Talara.

Fleet 
As of June 2022, the fleet of SKY Perú consists of the following aircraft:

All SKY Perú Airbus A320neo are equipped with 186 German-made ZIM brand pre-reclining seats with one USB connector for fast charging for compatible devices. To provide more comfort for passengers on longer routes, it was announced along with the introduction of the new Lima - Cancun route that these seats will be gradually replaced by reclining Recaro seats, with telephone support and international plugs with USB connectors.

References

External links

Airlines of Peru
Latin American and Caribbean Air Transport Association
Airlines established in 2019
Transport in Lima
2019 establishments in Peru